In-Bad the Sailor is a 1924 short comedy silent film directed by Philadelphian director, Benjamin Stoloff.

External links 
 

1924 films
1924 comedy films
American black-and-white films
American silent short films
Films directed by Benjamin Stoloff
1924 short films
Silent American comedy films
American comedy short films
1920s American films